Wolfgang Wagner (born 6 August 1938) is a retired German backstroke swimmer who won two medals at LEN European Aquatics Championships in 1958 and 1962. He also competed at the 1960 (100 m backstroke and 4 × 100 m medley relay) and 1964 Summer Olympics (200 m backstroke) with the best achievement of sixth place in the 100 m backstroke.

References

1938 births
German male swimmers
Swimmers at the 1960 Summer Olympics
Swimmers at the 1964 Summer Olympics
Male backstroke swimmers
Olympic swimmers of the United Team of Germany
Living people
European Aquatics Championships medalists in swimming
Sportspeople from Gera
20th-century German people
21st-century German people
People from Bezirk Gera